Bond Street Theatre initiates creative programming that inspires and educates youth, addresses human rights issues, heals communities affected by conflict, and promotes the value of the arts in shaping a peaceful future. The country's actor-educators work internationally in refugee camps, post-conflict zones, crisis areas, and with populations that have been victims of natural disaster, using theatre to promote healing, empowerment, and social development. Founded in 1976 in New York City, Bond Street Theatre  is an NGO in association with the United Nations Department of Public Information.

Overseas work 
Bond Street Theatre has initiated innovative theatre and theatre-based programs in over 40 countries worldwide, including:

Afghanistan
Since 2001, Bond Street Theatre has been working in Afghanistan to collaborate with local artists and rights groups, use the arts as a tool for education and community dialogue, revitalize the performing arts, introduce new styles of theatre, and work for women's rights. The company cooperates with NGOs and schools to train teachers and health workers in theatre-based techniques for teaching children.

In 2005, Bond Street Theatre created Beyond the Mirror, a physical-visual depiction of Afghan history in collaboration with Exile Theatre of Kabul, a theatre group the company had met in a refugee camp in Pakistan. The two groups presented the play in Afghanistan, Japan, Baltimore and New York. The project was the first US-Afghan theatre collaboration, and Exile Theatre is the first Afghan theatre group to perform in the USA. In 2009, Exile Theatre returned to the US for its second tour and the two companies presented Beyond the Mirror at the San Francisco International Arts Festival and the Fury Factory Festival in California. This arts exchange program was sponsored with the aid of the Association of Performing Arts Presenters and the US Bureau of Educational and Cultural Affairs.

In 2010, the company initiated a Theatre for Social Development program, building the capacity of Afghan theatre groups to develop productions that address social issues such as gender violence, health issues, conflict resolution, and other topics. In addition to theatre training, the program includes business training for local theatre groups to improve sustainability. Through this program, Bond Street Theatre has created four all-female theatre groups in Afghanistan, a first in the country. These companies allow live theatre to reach women in isolated communities, women's prisons, women's shelters, and other all-female domains. The United States Institute of Peace sponsored this innovative program along with the US Embassy in Kabul.

Bond Street Theatre's Voter Education and Fraud Mitigation Project prepared the Afghan population for the Presidential elections on April 5, 2014 and the subsequent run-off election on June 14. The project built on ongoing programs with four Afghan theatre groups to bring civic information to hard-to-reach places with a focus on reaching women and youth. The project was supported by the United States Institute of Peace, and reached over 200,000 Afghans.

The company's current Youth Engagement Project has brought young Afghans together from 25 provinces for leadership training and cross-cultural exchange. Youth from each province successfully implemented community service projects in their region, focusing on themes ranging from environmental conservation, to domestic violence, to child labor.

Myanmar 
Myanmar is the focus of a broader artistic initiative by Bond Street Theatre involving ongoing creative work with Burmese refugees in Bangladesh and Thailand. Prolonged conflict between the Myanmar government and many internal ethnic groups has resulted in mass-migrations to neighboring countries. Bond Street Theatre created a play with the Gitameit Music School combining traditional and modern forms of Burmese theatre with its own physical-visual theatre style to perform in Myanmar and in the surrounding refugee areas.

In 2009–2010, Bond Street Theatre worked as US State Department Cultural Envoys in Burma with Thila Min of Thukhuma Khayeethe (Art Travelers) Theatre. They created and performed The Handwashing Show, a show that creatively stressed the importance of hygiene. The show traveled to monastery schools and jungle villages near the Thai border.

The company returned in the Spring of 2011 to continue their theatrical programming, and further develop a full-length production with Thukhuma Khayeethe about current issues facing Myanmar. This production will tour throughout the region in 2016/17.

Haiti 
In the spring of 2011, Bond Street Theatre brought a three-week program of performances and workshops to the displaced population living in tent camps in Port-au-Prince and applied theatre-based methods toward post-crisis healing, empowerment and improved life skills as a means of community education and development. They worked in conjunction with the all-female theatre group FAVILEK (Women Victims Get Up, Stand Up), which was founded in 1991 by ten survivors of domestic and political violence.

Bond Street Theatre focused on issues facing women and girls in the camps while also developing a supportive and constructive environment for the male population in order to combat the rising rate of gender and sexual violence. The company drew upon its vast experience of theatrical techniques to create a comprehensive, enriching program to address and develop positive group dynamics, build self-esteem, address trauma, stimulate imagination, create hope and cultivate empowerment and leadership.

India 
Bond Street Theatre collaborated on a theatre-based project for populations in India in collaboration with the Indian theatre group, Purvabhyas Theatre, and Exile Theatre of Afghanistan. The three-country team (US-Afghanistan-India) worked with rural women to encourage self-expression and confidence, with street-working children to initiate non-violent "life skills," and with youth to explore the nature of ethnic and religious disputes. The multi-year project was sponsored by the US Bureau of Educational and Cultural Affairs (US Department of State).

In cooperation with UNICEF, Bond Street Theatre created the South Asia Social Theatre Institute (SASTI) at the Gandhi Center in Delhi as a center for study and training in theatre-based approaches to leadership, conflict prevention, healing, and the transfer of information.

The Balkans
In the summer of 2000, one year after the war which devastated Kosovo, Bond Street Theatre collaborated with Theatre Tsvete, an award-winning puppet theatre company from Bulgaria, to create a non-verbal version of Romeo & Juliet. Both companies met while performing in the Kosovar refugee camps the prior year. The two companies performed their collaborative "Romeo & Juliet" in war-torn theatres across Kosovo in 2000, and in Serbia, Albania, Bosnia & Herzegovina, Macedonia, Romania, Croatia and Bulgaria in the following years.

Performing Artists for Balkan Peace
In 2005, Bond Street Theatre and Theatre Tsvete initiated Performing Artists for Balkan Peace, an ongoing and expanding network of professional theatre companies, individual performing artists, and other theatre practitioners devoted to the active pursuit of peace, social progress and artistic cooperation through the performing arts, and placing an emphasis on strengthening the role of artists in the community. Performing Artists for Balkan Peace includes theatre practitioners from 10 companies from Albania, Bosnia and Herzegovina, Kosovo, Serbia, Macedonia, Bulgaria, Greece, England and the United States. Their first collaborative production, Honey and Blood, performed in Blagoevgrad and Sofia, Bulgaria in 2005 and at the International Festival of Authorial Poetics in Mostar, Bosnia and Herzegovina in 2006.

Israel 
As a resident company at the 1984 Israel Festival, Bond Street Theatre brought together 60 Palestinian, Kurdish, and Jewish actors of all ages to create an expansive street theatre spectacle and Jerusalem's first professional street theatre company, which continued for many years.

Young Audiences Program
The company's programs for young audiences illuminate world arts and cultures, historical figures, the relationship between math and music, and other curricula topics. The Young Audience Program is presented in New York City public schools, New York City libraries, and city parks.

Productions
Since 1977, the Bond Street Theatre ensemble has developed 19 original productions, 4 adaptations of classic plays, 9 shows for young audiences, and one film, all of which have been presented in major festivals and theatres in the US and abroad. These productions have reflected the social issues of their times: pollution, nuclear waste, war, consumerism, guns, working, inter-ethnic conflict, homelessness, religion and science.

Internationally, the company presented the first political street theatre in East Berlin in 50 years (1990), created programs for street children in Brazil (1992, 1996), established Jerusalem's first street theatre company with Arabs, Kurds and Jews together (1984), taught Catholic and Protestant children side by side in Belfast (1990), worked with refugees from 60 countries in Montreal (1987), Kosovar refugees in Macedonia (1999), and Afghan refugees in Pakistan (2002).

Selected Productions:
 Nightmare on Wall Street – the first legal political street theatre in East Berlin in 50 years, performed to an amazed crowd in Alexanderplatz, East Berlin.
 Werk – a production centered on labor which does not get acknowledged, and paying homage to human self-sufficiency and resourcefulness, Werk was presented in Beijing, China for the 1995 UN Conference on Women, and in Brazil in 1996.
 Cozmic Jazz – a satiric and humorous story about humanity and a comic commentary on "the meaning of life."
 Beyond the Mirror – created with Exile Theatre of Kabul, Afghanistan in 2005, Beyond the Mirror is the first ever US-Afghan theatre collaboration.
 The Mechanical – a production transplanting the outcast creature from Mary Shelley's novel Frankenstein into the true story of a sensational chess-playing robot built in the late 18th century.

History
Founded in 1976 by a group of physical actors dedicated to innovative theatre and motivated by a passion to be useful in the world, in its early years the company used a diverse physical, visual and musical vocabulary to create entertaining and relevant performances exemplifying theatre's ability to illuminate social and environmental issues.

In 1983, Bond Street Theatre established the Palenville Interarts Colony, an artists' retreat in upstate New York that fostered interdisciplinary collaboration and reached underserved rural audiences. The Colony also produced a community arts project and a Presenting Program, which presented artists such as Dave Brubeck & sons, Eiko & Koma, Bread & Puppet, Talking Band, and others. As a way to bring the community and the Colony closer together, the group created a Children's Circus – complete with Circus Band – that toured the county with their colorful circus tent, snappy costumes, and amazing feats of physical prowess! The Circus delighted audiences in New York for five years and encouraged the circus arts to thrive across three counties. The Governor of New York named a day in our honor, Palenville Circus Day. Dave Brubeck and his sons gave the Palenville Interarts Colony and the Palenville Children's Circus two fantastic benefit concerts in the Theatre on the Colony grounds.

The Shinbone Alley Stilt Band emerged as the live band accompanying the street theatre shows in the early 1980s that were performed in New York City. Originally, the performers would parade and play music, while characters on stilts would parade around before the show. Eventually, all the company members learned to walk on stilts. The Shinbone Alley Stilt Band was named after the alley next to the theatre on Bond Street, and made its debut with its new name in 1988 at a performance in Nagasaki, Japan. The Band still plays frequently at events in and around New York City.

As the company developed more international ties and incorporated more intercultural studies, the group began touring international festivals and theatres on a regular basis. In 1984, Bond Street Theatre traveled to the Israel Festival, where its members were exposed to peacebuilding work firsthand.

Over the last two decades, the need for cross-cultural understanding has been magnified and Bond Street Theatre has shifted in light of that change. To date, the company has initiated innovative theatre and theatre-based programs in over 40 countries worldwide, and reached populations in refugee camps, schools, shelters, prisons, rural villages and urban centers.

Today, the company focuses on using the performing arts as a form of humanitarian outreach and as a tool for education and healing in refugee camps, areas of conflict and post-war environments. The ensemble collaborates with local artists to enjoy the mutual benefits of artistic exchange, and to promote the value of the arts in advancing peace and shaping our collective future. In addition, the company finds the means to bring our collaborators to the US to bring the issues of the world closer to our local communities, to dispel misunderstandings about other cultures, traditions and religions, and to facilitate effective cross-cultural communication.

Bond Street Theatre continues to present innovative work in venues around the world. They initiate theatre programs for diverse community populations and collaborate with artists globally. In the US, the company maintains an active Arts-in-Education program in schools and a popular Internship program that answers the growing interest among young artists in social theatre and internationally responsive arts programming.

Awards
Bond Street Theatre received an award from The John D. and Catherine T. MacArthur Foundation (1990), presented at the United Nations Conference on Women in Beijing (1995), traveled as US State Department Cultural Envoys to Burma (2009), presented at the Arts in One World Conference (2010), won first prize at the Meppel Festival in Netherlands, and won Best Show at the KimTom Festival in Shanghai.

References

Theatres in Manhattan
1976 establishments in New York City